Rozhanitsy, narecnitsy, and sudzhenitsy are invisible spirits or deities of fate in the pre-Christian religion of the Slavs. They are related to pregnancy, motherhood, marriage and female ancestors, and are often referenced together with Rod. They are usually mentioned as three together, but sometimes up to 9 together, of whom one was a "queen" or singular. They are related to Dola, but it is not known on what terms. In Poland they were worshipped as zorze (auroras).

Names and meaning 
In different regions of the Slavs and languages they were named differently: 

 Croatian: rodjenice, rojenice, roženice, sudice, sudjenice, sujenice
 Slovene: rodjenice, rojenice, sudice, sojenice, sujenice
 Bulgarian: sudženici, narŭčnici, orisnici, urisnici, uresici
 Czech and Slovak: rodjenice, sudjenice, sudičky
 Polish: rodzanice, narecznice, sudiczki
 Romanian: ursitoare
 Serbian: suđaje, suđenice, rođenice, narečnici
 Old East Slavic, Russian: rožanice, udĕlnicy
 Ukrainian: rožanyci

The terms rodzanica, rodjenica or rojenica come from the word roditi ("giving birth") and literally mean "woman giving birth".

The terms sudiczka, sudica, or sojenica come from the word sud ("judgment", "judge", "court") and literally mean "judging woman".

The terms narecznica, nerechnitsa, narucnica mean "name-giving woman".

The term udelnica means "granting woman".

The Bulgarian terms orisnici, urisnici, uresici come from the Greek word όρίζοντες (orizontes "establish") and mean "establishing woman”.

Among the Eastern Slavs, the personification of good fortune was also known as Dolya, whose name means "division", "participation", and bad luck as Nedolya. Among Serbs and Croats, on the other hand, there is Sreća, whose name means "luck".

In some regions of Poland, the functions of rozhanitsy were fulfilled by other figures: boginki in Lesser Poland, kraśniki in Pomerania. In The Catalogue Of Rudolph's Magic, written by Edward Karvot, who wrote the information collected by Brother Rudolf about the customs of pagan Western Slavs, we read that the Slavs "make sacrifices to their three sisters, which the pagans call Clotho, Lachesis and Atropos to lend them wealth." Rudolph, probably not knowing the language of the Slavs, gave rozhanitsy the names of Moirai, which he knew from Greek mythology, and who perform the same functions as the rozhanitsy.

The rozhanitsy after Christianization were replaced by the Mothers of God or saint women. In Russian charms of a maturing boy, Parascheva, Anastasia and Barbara are mentioned, and in Bulgarian folklore Mother of God, Parascheva and Anastasia. Angels or even Christ Himself also took over the functions of rozhanitsy.

Sources 
The 11th-century Word of St. Gregory Theologian about how pagans bowed to idols is the first source mentioning rozhanitsy:

The Word of Chrystolubiec describes the prayers dedicated to Rod and the rozhanitsy:

The cult of rozhanitsy was still popular in 16th-century Rus', as evidenced by penance given during confession by Orthodox priests described in the penitentiaries of Saint Sabbas of Storozhi[1:

Izmail Sreznevsky collected the following sources in his Materials for the Old Russian dictionary:

Narecnitsy often appear in various South Slavic legends and epics. One of these is the epic of Prince Marko:

The first to record the cult of auroras was the ethnographer Zorian Dołęga-Chodakowski. He wrote about it in his work About Slavdom before Christianity:

Polish literature historian Stefan Vrtel-Wierczyński in Medieval Polish secular poetry wrote a spell discovered by Brückner:

The Polish folklorist Stanisław Czernik in his book Trzy zorze dziewicze: wśród zamawiań i zaklęć (Three virgin auroras: among orders and spells) cites the following spell:

The Wisła geographical and ethnographic monthly gives the following spell over a baby crying at night, that is spell for three days during sunset, and a prayer for a good husband:

Appearance 
In the folklore of the Southern Slavs, rozhanitsy are described as beautiful girls or as good-natured elderly women. Sometimes they are also represented as three women of different ages: a girl, an adult woman and an elderly woman. Southern Slavs described them as beautiful figures with white, round cheeks. They were said to be dressed in white clothes, to have a white cap (mob cap) on their heads and to have silver and gold jewelry. In their hands they were said to hold burning candles through which their silhouettes were easily visible in the moonlight.

Czechs described them as white-dressed virgins or old women. They were said to be tall and transparent, their cheeks pale, their eyes apt to sparkle and charm people and their hair decorated with precious stones. Like the southern Slavs, they were said to wear white bonnets or veils.

Functions and cult 

They were said to look after pregnant women, and after giving birth to a child, they determined his fate for the rest of his life. The rozhanitsy appeared at midnight three days after the birth of the child, at his cradle, when they were supposed to foretell the child's good or bad fate for life. After determining the fate of the child, it was saved as an indelible mark on the forehead. The rozhanitsy's opinions on the future of the child were often contradictory, and the final, oldest parent makes the final decision. The first, youngest rozhanitsa spins, the second measures and the third cuts off the thread of life – the longer the thread, the longer life will be. Among southern Slavs, rozhanitsy were sometimes distinguished from sudzhenitsy, who were said to appear before death and during important moments in life. Rozhanitsy were sometimes called upon to protect the family from illness.

According to Procopius, Slavs did not believe in destiny:

According to sources, a trapezoidal table with bread, honey, cheese and groat (kutia) was prepared in honor of the rozhanitsy, sometimes the meal was left in the shrines. A child's first haircut was sacrified to the rozhanitsy – the cut hair should be offered to the rozhanitsy. Slovenes and Croats used to put candles, wine, bread and salt in the room where the woman lies the day after delivery. Failure to do so threatened that rozhanitsy would determine a child's bad fortune. Slovenians living in Istria laid bread under the boulders next to the caves in which rozhanitsy were said to live, and in Bulgaria suppers were prepared for them. In Czechia, a table was prepared at which white clothes and chairs were waiting for the rozhanitsy along with a chair on which bread, salt and butter were laid, and sometimes cheese and beer. One of Rod and the rozhanitsy's holidays was said to be December 26, which after Christianization was replaced by the Orthodox Church with the Feast of the Mother of God.

The rozhanitsy were said to live at the end of the world in the palace of the Sun, which could connect them to the solar deity.

In many European religions, there are three female figures foretelling the child's future, which indicates the Indo-European origin of the rozhanitsy:

Roman Parcae
Greek Moirai
Norse Norns
Celtic Brigid in three persons or three Matres
Baltic Laima, who sometimes appeared in three forms

Goddess Rozhanitsa 
Old Russian sources also mention Rozhanitsa as a single person, usually in the pair of Rod and Rodzanica. An example of such a source is the 12th-century chronicle Gesta regum Anglorum, which describes the cult of Svetovid among the Slavs of the Elbe, comparing him to the Roman Fortuna and Greek Týchē. The 13th-century Russian translation of this chronicle translates Fortuna as Rozhanitsa (Рожданица). Another example could be the Word about how pagans bowed to idols: "Artemis and Artemisa called Rod and Roshanitsa". In such a situation, Rozhanitsa could be interpreted as a Mother Goddess – the goddess of fertility and motherhood. According to mythologists, the triple deities of fate are the hypostasis of the ancient goddess of fate. Pragermani Urðr and early Greek Clotho are thought to be such goddesses. A similar process probably took place among the Slavs, and in that situation Dolya could be the original goddess of fate.

Boris Rybakov linked Rozhanitsa with Lada, claiming that Lada was Rod's partner and also the first rozhanitsa.

In popular culture 
Percival Schuttenbach - Rodzanice (Strzyga album)

References

Bibliography 
 
 
 
 
 
 
 
 

 
 
 
 

Slavic mythology
Slavic neopaganism
Destiny
Time and fate deities